The 1910 U.S. National Championships (now known as the US Open) took place on the outdoor grass courts at the Newport Casino in Newport, United States. The men's singles tournament ran from 15 August until 25 August while the women's singles and doubles championship took place from 20 June to 26 June at the Philadelphia Cricket Club in Chestnut Hill. It was the 30th staging of the U.S. National Championships, and the third Grand Slam tennis event of the year.

Finals

Men's singles

  William Larned (USA) defeated   Tom Bundy (USA) 6–1, 5–7, 6–0, 6–8, 6–1

Women's singles

 Hazel Hotchkiss (USA) defeated   Louise Hammond (USA) 6–4, 6–2

Men's doubles
 Fred Alexander (USA) /  Harold Hackett (USA) defeated  Tom Bundy (USA) /  Trowridge Hendrick (USA) 6–1, 8–6, 6–3

Women's doubles
 Hazel Hotchkiss (USA) /   Edith Rotch  (USA) defeated  Adelaide Browning (USA) /  Edna Wildey (USA) 6–4, 6–4

Mixed doubles
 Hazel Hotchkiss (USA) /  Joseph Carpenter, Jr. (USA) defeated  Edna Wildey (USA) /  Herbert M. Tilden (USA) 6–2, 6–2

References

External links
Official US Open website

 
U.S. National Championships
U.S. National Championships (tennis) by year
U.S. National Championships (tennis)
U.S. National Championships (tennis)
U.S. National Championships (tennis)
U.S. National Championships (tennis)
U.S. National Championships (tennis)